is a Japanese football player for Montedio Yamagata.

Club statistics
Updated to 7 December 2022.

References

External links

2000 births
Living people
Association football people from Akita Prefecture
Japanese footballers
J2 League players
J3 League players
Montedio Yamagata players
Azul Claro Numazu players
Association football goalkeepers